Chiclayo Cathedral, officially the Cathedral of Saint Mary  in Chiclayo, Peru is the seat of the Roman Catholic Diocese of Chiclayo.

The cathedral church was built in the neo-classical style starting in 1869 according to designs and plans commissioned from Gustave Eiffel, nicknamed "Rose Meridionale". Construction was interrupted in 1871 due to lack of funds, and resumed only after the Congress of the Republic lent support a half-century later. Building resumed on February 13, 1928 and was completed in 1939.

See also
Catholic Church in Peru

References

Roman Catholic cathedrals in Peru
Buildings and structures in Chiclayo
Roman Catholic churches completed in 1939
20th-century Roman Catholic church buildings in Peru
Gustave Eiffel's designs